The St. Bonaventure Bonnies (formerly the St. Bonaventure Brown Indians from 1927 to 1992) are the varsity intercollegiate athletic programs of St. Bonaventure University, based in St. Bonaventure, New York between the two towns of Allegany and Olean. The Bonnies compete in the National Collegiate Athletics Association's Division I Atlantic 10 Conference, of which it has been a member since 1979. The programs' mascot is the Bona Wolf and the colors are brown and white.

They have collectively won 13 team conference championships, as well as numerous individual conference titles and accolades.

Sports sponsored 

A member of the Atlantic 10 Conference (A-10), St. Bonaventure University sponsors teams in nine men's and eight women's NCAA sanctioned sports. The Bonnies men's lacrosse program competed as an associate member of the Metro Atlantic Athletic Conference through the 2022 season, after which the A-10 established a men's lacrosse league.

Baseball

The Bonnies were coached by Larry Sudbrook for 35 seasons. The team captured Atlantic 10 division championships in 2000 and 2002. The 2004 squad won the Atlantic 10 championship and made its first appearance in the NCAA tournament. They are currently coached by B. J. Salerno.

Men's basketball

The men's basketball program has enjoyed success on and off throughout its history, including an NCAA Final Four appearance in 1970, and an NIT Championship in 1977. St. Bonaventure's most recent NCAA Tournament appearance was in 2021, where it lost in the first Round to LSU. Its most recent victory was in the 2018 Tournament where the Bonnies won their play-in game against UCLA. The win marked the program's first NCAA Tournament win since reaching the Elite Eight in 1970. The Bonnies would drop their next game, a 77–62 loss to Florida.  Currently, St. Bonaventure's head men's basketball coach is Mark Schmidt. St. Bonaventure won the Atlantic 10 regular season and tournament championships in 2021.

NBA Hall of Famer Bob Lanier played at St. Bonaventure, leading them to the 1970 Final Four. The men's and women's basketball teams play at the 6,012-seat Reilly Center. The playing surface was renamed Bob Lanier Court in a dedication ceremony on October 12, 2007. Lanier attended along with his mother, sister, and daughter.

Women's basketball

In the 2011–2012 season, the Bonnies women's basketball team had the best season in their history. They accumulated a record of 31–4 in the regular season, including a perfect 14–0 record in the Atlantic 10 conference. They were ranked as high as 16th in the national polls and earned a 5th seed in the NCAA Tournament. They beat Florida Gulf Coast and Marist in the Tallahassee Regional to advance to the Sweet 16, where they lost to eventual national runner-up Notre Dame. The women's basketball team made its second NCAA Tournament appearance in 2016.

Men's lacrosse
In 2017 the Bonnie's announced they would add men's lacrosse as a varsity team, beginning in the 2018-2019 academic year. In the program's fourth varsity season, it captured the 2022 MAAC Regular Season Championship. The Bonnies are coached by Canadian Lacrosse Hall of Fame inductee Randy Mearns.

Former sports

Football

St. Bonaventure fielded an American football team sporadically from 1892 to 1970. The program gained national recognition in the post-World War II era under Coach Hugh Devore, a former All-American player at Notre Dame. The Brown Indians compiled a record of 25-9-1 during his tenure, which ended after the 1949 season (http://archives.sbu.edu/football/the_history.htm).

Wrestling
The Brown Indians had a wrestling team in 1927, led by player-coach Ed George, and again in 1954, coached by Mike Green. They were winless each season, going 0–2 in 1927 and 0–1 in 1954. Due to their lopsided loss to Alfred Ag Tech in 1954, they discontinued the sport.

Ice Hockey
While currently a club team, St. Bonaventure had a Division III from 1982 through 1993. The Brown Indians had success as an independent recording four consecutive winning seasons before joining the ECAC West in 1986. After a 19–11 mark the program declined and finished near the bottom of the conference for six years before the program dropped from Division III to club status.

Accolades

NCAA postseason appearances

Conference championships

Conference regular-season championships

All-Americans

Men's basketball
 Tom Stith, 1960, consensus First Team
 Tom Stith, 1961, consensus First Team
 Bob Lanier, 1968, consensus Second Team
 Bob Lanier, 1970, consensus First Team
Andrew Nicholson, 2012, AP Honorable Mention
 Jaylen Adams 2018, AP Honorable Mention

Bonnies in the Olympics

Bonnies in the Paralympics

Facilities
Source:

Mascot and colors

The school's current mascot is the Bona Wolf, the third mascot in school history. The wolf is a reference to the Wolf of Gubbio, a story from the life of St. Francis. The school's colors, brown and white, reflect the colors of Franciscan friar robes.  The university is closely affiliated with this religious order.

From 1927 to 1992, St. Bonaventure's mascot was the Brown Indian. The school's athletics logo during this period featured a stylized letter "B" with a war bonnet hanging over the left side. As part of an ongoing debate over Native American mascots, however, this was changed to the Bona Fanatic.  This new mascot was poorly received, so much so that costume wearers were assaulted by St. Bonaventure fans. After only a few years (1996–1998) in existence, the Fanatic was dropped in favor of the current Bona Wolf.

Fight song
The school fight song is "Unfurl the Brown and White." The song was written by St. Bonaventure graduates L.G. O'Brien '25 and C.R. Kean '24.

References

External links

 

 
Rugby union teams in New York (state)